The 2017 Lithuanian Supercup (Lithuanian: LFF Supertaurė) was the 17th edition of the Lithuanian Supercup since its establishment in 1995, the annual Lithuanian football season-opening match contested by the winners of the previous season's top league and cup competitions (or league runner-up in case the league- and cup-winning club is the same). It took place on 26 February 2017 at the Sportima Arena in Vilnius, and was contested between Žalgiris, the 2016 A Lyga and 2016 Lithuanian Football Cup winners, and Trakai, the 2016 A Lyga runners-up.

Žalgiris were the defending champions having won the cup for four previous years.

Žalgiris won the tie 1–0 with substitute Mahamane Traoré scoring the only goal of the match in 76th minute after a critical mistake by Trakai goalkeeper Ignas Plūkas.

Match

References

2017
FK Žalgiris matches
FK Riteriai matches
Supercup
Sports competitions in Vilnius
February 2017 sports events in Europe
21st century in Vilnius